Joakim Ramsten (born December 20, 1991) is a Swedish professional ice hockey player. He played with AIK IF in the Elitserien during the 2010–11 Elitserien season.

References

External links

1991 births
AIK IF players
Living people
Swedish ice hockey right wingers